Dubai Investment Park is a rapid transit station on the Route 2020 branch of the Red Line of the Dubai Metro in Dubai, UAE, serving Dubai Investment Park.

The metro station opened on 1 June 2021 at the same time as the Expo 2020 station as part of Route 2020, created to link central Dubai to the Expo 2020 exhibition site. The schedule was delayed due to the COVID-19 pandemic in the United Arab Emirates.

The station is one of two underground stations on the Route 2020 section of the Red Line. It is located at the Green Community in Dubai Investment Park. Facilities included bus stops, disabled parking, retail units, and a taxi drop-off zone.

References

Railway stations in the United Arab Emirates opened in 2021
Dubai Metro stations